Shargacucullia blattariae is a moth of the family Noctuidae. The species was first described by Eugenius Johann Christoph Esper in 1790. It is found in south-eastern Europe, the Near East, Israel and Jordan.

Adults are on wing from April to May. There is one generation per year.

The larvae feed on Scrophularia species, including Scrophularia canina.

External links

Cuculliinae
Insects of Turkey
Moths of the Middle East